Eophrynus prestvicii is an extinct species of arachnid belonging to the order Trigonotarbida.

Historical background
The first trigonotarbid was described in 1837 from the Coal Measures of Coalbrookdale in England by the famous English geologist Dean William Buckland. He believed it to be a fossil beetle and named it Curculoides prestvicii. A much better preserved example was later discovered from Coseley near Dudley; also in the English West Midlands conurbation.

Description
These arachnids were similar to modern spiders, but they could not produce silk. Recent x-ray imaging revealed that Eophrynus prestvicii were covered by protective spikes on the back-half of its body. This creature had long legs enabling it to run and hunt on the forest floor. Scientists at Imperial College London created a detailed 3D computer model of the arachnid from fossils.

Distribution
This species is known from a handful of good quality fossils preserved inside siderite concretions. Fossils of this species have been found in the Carboniferous sediments of United Kingdom.

References

 Jason A. Dunlop and Russell J. Garwood  Tomographic reconstruction of the exceptionally preserved trigonotarbid arachnid Eophrynus prestvicii
 An arachnid of the Carboniferous

Trigonotarbids
Carboniferous arachnids
Carboniferous arthropods of Europe
Carboniferous England
Fossils of Great Britain
Mississippian first appearances
Mississippian extinctions